The 1971 Oakland Athletics season involved the A's finishing first in the American League West with a record of 101 wins and 60 losses (their best record in the Swingin' A's era).  In their first postseason appearance of any kind since 1931, the A's were swept in three games by the Baltimore Orioles in the American League Championship Series.

Offseason
 January 13, 1971: 1971 Major League Baseball Draft (January Draft) notable picks:
Round 5: Rich Dauer (did not sign) 
Secondary Phase
Round 1: Phil Garner
Round 3: Steve Staggs (did not sign)

Regular season 
Vida Blue became the first black player in the history of the American League to win the American League Cy Young Award. He was also the youngest AL player in the 20th century to win the MVP Award. During the year, Vida Blue was on the cover of Sports Illustrated and Time magazine.

Season standings

Record vs. opponents

Opening Day starters 
 1B Don Mincher
 2B Dick Green
 3B Sal Bando
 SS Bert Campaneris
 LF Felipe Alou
 CF Rick Monday
 RF Reggie Jackson
 C Dave Duncan
 P Vida Blue

Notable transactions 
 May 8, 1971: Frank Fernández, Don Mincher, Paul Lindblad, and cash were traded by the Athletics to the Washington Senators for Darold Knowles and Mike Epstein.
 May 26, 1971: Rob Gardner was traded by the Athletics to the New York Yankees for Curt Blefary.
 June 12, 1971: Champ Summers was signed by the Athletics as an amateur free agent.

Roster

Player stats

Batting

Starters by position 
Note: Pos = Position; G = Games played; AB = At bats; H = Hits; Avg. = Batting average; HR = Home runs; RBI = Runs batted in

Other batters 
Note: G = Games played; AB = At bats; H = Hits; Avg. = Batting average; HR = Home runs; RBI = Runs batted in

Pitching

Starting pitchers 
Note: G = Games pitched; IP = Innings pitched; W = Wins; L = Losses; ERA = Earned run average; SO = Strikeouts

Other pitchers 
Note: G = Games pitched; IP = Innings pitched; W = Wins; L = Losses; ERA = Earned run average; SO = Strikeouts

Relief pitchers 
Note: G = Games pitched; W = Wins; L = Losses; SV = Saves; ERA = Earned run average; SO = Strikeouts

Awards and honors 
 Vida Blue, P, American League Cy Young Award
 Vida Blue, P, American League Most Valuable Player Award. Sal Bando, second in American League MVP voting
 Dick Williams, Associated Press AL Manager of the Year

All-Stars 
1971 Major League Baseball All-Star Game
 Vida Blue, pitcher, starter
 Dave Duncan, reserve
 Reggie Jackson, reserve

1971 American League Championship Series

Game 1 
Sunday, October 3, 1971, at Memorial Stadium in Baltimore, Maryland

Game 2 
Monday, October 4, 1971, at Memorial Stadium in Baltimore, Maryland

Game 3 
Tuesday, October 5, 1971, at Oakland-Alameda County Coliseum in Oakland, California

Farm system

References

External links
1971 Oakland Athletics team page at Baseball Reference
1971 Oakland Athletics team page at www.baseball-almanac.com

Oakland Athletics seasons
Oakland Athletics season
American League West champion seasons
Oakland Athletics